This is a list of Ministers for Foreign Affairs of Malta. The ministry was established in 1964, and is now housed at Palazzo Parisio and other buildings in Valletta.

List
Political parties

Gallery

See also
 Ministry for Foreign and European Affairs (Malta)
 Government of Malta

Sources
 Maltese ministries, etc – Rulers.org

Foreign
Foreign
Foreign Ministers
Politicians